Taimei Maru was a 2,883 ton transport ship of the Imperial Japanese Army during World War II.

Built by Mitsubishi Jukogyo K.K., Yokohama and launched in 1936 for Kinkai Yusen K.K. She was sold in 1939 to Nippon Yusen K.K..

She left Rabaul, New Britain on 1 March 1943, as part of Operation 81, carrying a cargo of troops, equipment, fuel, landing craft and ammunition for Lae, New Guinea. The convoy was attacked by aircraft of the United States Army Air Forces and Royal Australian Air Force from 2 March 1943, known as the Battle of the Bismarck Sea. Taimei Maru was bombed on 3 March and sank at 07°15'S., 148°30'E. 
Of those aboard, some 200 were killed during the attack.

Notes

References

1936 ships
Ships built by Mitsubishi Heavy Industries
Maritime incidents in March 1943
Ships sunk by US aircraft
Ships sunk by Australian aircraft
Shipwrecks in the Bismarck Sea